Football Outsiders (FO) is a website started in July 2003 which focuses on advanced statistical analysis of the National Football League (NFL). The site is run by a staff of regular writers, who produce a series of weekly columns using both the site's in-house statistics and their personal analyses of NFL games.

In 2005 and 2006, the site partnered with FOXSports.com to cross-publish many of the Outsiders' regular features, including power rankings based on a "weighted" version of the DVOA (Defense-adjusted Value Over Average) statistic. In 2007, Football Outsiders content appeared on FOXSports.com (in a reduced capacity) along with AOL Sports and ESPN.com. Since 2008, the site has partnered exclusively with ESPN and provides mostly ESPN Insider content. In 2009, Football Outsiders began analyzing college football using similar statistical principles.

History

Football Outsiders was launched in August 2003 by Aaron Schatz, with two regular columns, one of which used an early version of the proprietary DVOA statistic. The original purpose of the site was to disprove a statement by Boston Globe reporter Ron Borges that the 2002 New England Patriots failed to make the postseason because they could not establish the run. Over the course of time, the site added more writers, and hosted Gregg Easterbrook for part of 2003.

Between 2004 and 2005, the site introduced new statistics such as Defense-adjusted Points Above Replacement (DPAR, later Defense-adjusted Yards Above Replacement, DYAR) and Adjusted Line Yards (ALY). In 2005, the site began to cross-publish many of its columns on FOXsports.com.  In 2005, Football Outsiders also took over publication of Pro Football Prospectus, a book giving a preview of the upcoming NFL season.  In 2009, the annual was renamed Football Outsiders Almanac.

Currently, the site has incorporated the 1983–2020 NFL seasons into their statistics.

Key Metrics

Football Outsiders has devised a series of proprietary formulas to calculate different advanced metrics.

DVOA
DVOA (Defense-adjusted Value Over Average) calculates a team's success based on the down-and-distance of each play during the season, then calculates how much more or less successful each team is compared to the league average. According to Football Outsiders, DVOA "breaks down every single play of the NFL season to see how much success offensive players achieved in each specific situation compared to the league average in that situation, adjusted for the strength of the opponent. ... Football has one objective -- to get to the end zone -- and two ways to achieve that, by gaining yards and getting first downs. These two goals need to be balanced to determine a player's value or a team's performance."

There is a separate DVOA measurement for special teams, which "compare[s] each kick or punt to the league average for based on the point value of field position at the position of each kick, catch, and return."

DYAR
DYAR (Defense-adjusted Yards Above Replacement) calculates each player's cumulative value above or below a "replacement-level" alternative. DYAR differs from DVOA in calculating a player's total value through the course of a year, and not on a play-for-play rate. States Football Outsiders, "DVOA, by virtue of being a percentage or rate statistic, doesn’t take into account the cumulative value of having a player producing at a league-median level over the course of an above-average number of plays. By definition, a median level of performance is better than that provided by half of the league and the ability to maintain that level of performance while carrying a heavy work load is very valuable indeed."

Adjusted Line Yards
Adjusted Line Yards (ALY) "differentiate[s] between the contribution of the running back and the contribution of the offensive line." ALY attempts to "separate the effect that the running back has on a particular play from the effect of the offensive line (and other offensive blockers) and the effect of the defense. ... Yardage ends up falling into roughly the following combinations: Losses, 0-4 yards, 5-10 yards, and 11+ yards. In general, the offensive line is 20% more responsible for lost yardage than it is for yardage gained up to four yards, but 50% less responsible for yardage gained from 5-10 yards, and not responsible for yardage past that. Thus, the creation of Adjusted Line Yards."

Drive Stats
Drive Stats calculate a team's average success rate on a possession-by-possession basis: "[E]ach team's total number of drives as well as average yards per drive, points per drive, touchdowns per drive, punts per drive, and turnovers per drive, interceptions per drive, and fumbles lost per drive. LOS/Drive represents average starting field position (line of scrimmage) per drive from the offensive point of view. Drive stats are given for offense and defense, with NET representing simply offense minus defense."

Pythagorean projection

Another metric Football Outsiders uses is Pythagorean projection, which estimates wins in a season by a formula originally conceived by baseball analyst Bill James, that takes the square of team points, and divides it by the sum of the squares of team points scored and allowed.

The 2011 edition of Football Outsiders Almanac states, "From 1988 through 2004, 11 of 16 Super Bowls were won by the team that led the NFL in Pythagorean wins, while only seven were won by the team with the most actual victories. Super Bowl champions that led the league in Pythagorean wins but not actual wins include the 2004 Patriots, 2000 Ravens, 1999 Rams and 1997 Broncos."

Although Football Outsiders Almanac acknowledges that the formula had been less-successful in picking Super Bowl participants from 2005-2008, it reasserted itself in 2009 and 2010.

Furthermore, "[t]he Pythagorean projection is also still a valuable predictor of year-to-year improvement. Teams that win a minimum of one full game more than their Pythagorean projection tend to regress the following year; teams that win a minimum of one full game less than their Pythagoerean projection tend to improve the following year, particularly if they were at or above .500 despite their underachieving. For example, the 2008 New Orleans Saints went 8-8 despite 9.5 Pythagorean wins, hinting at the improvement that came with the next year's championship season."

DVOA results

Each year, Football Outsiders calculates the best and worst teams, per play, with the DVOA metric (see above). Below is a list of the highest- and lowest-rated teams in the league in each year from 1985-2019.

Pro Football Prospectus and Football Outsiders Almanac

From 2005 through 2008, Football Outsiders published the Pro Football Prospectus book each year before the football season began.  It included an essay for each team analyzing the previous season, evaluating off-season moves, and projecting future performance.

In 2009, Football Outsiders did not publish a Pro Football Prospectus volume, but instead produced the self-published Football Outsiders Almanac 2009. The reason for this is explained in the book:

So why the name change, and why aren’t we in bookstores?

For those who don’t know, our first four books were published through an agreement with Prospectus Entertainment Ventures, the company that owns Baseball Prospectus (as well as the expansion projects Basketball Prospectus and Puck Prospectus). It was PEV that had the publishing contract (first with Workman, then Plume). This year, for various reasons, Plume decided they no longer wanted to publish books related to other sports besides baseball. Other publishers were interested in doing our book, but by the time Plume made their decision, it was too late to get on the publication schedule for 2009.

Management
Editor-in-Chief: Aaron Schatz
Senior Editor: Vince Verhei
Senior Writer: Mike Tanier

Books
Pro Football Forecast 2004
Pro Football Prospectus 2005
Pro Football Prospectus 2006
Pro Football Prospectus 2007
Pro Football Prospectus 2008
Football Outsiders Almanac 2009
Football Outsiders Almanac 2010
Football Outsiders Almanac 2011
Football Outsiders Almanac 2012

General references

Bob Glauber, http://www.newsday.com/sports/football/glauber-s-nfl-hot-reads-1.811959/a-football-outsider-s-perspective-1.1413423 "Glauber's NFL Hot Reads"], Newsday.com (September 1, 2009).
"Football Outsider: Football Statistics from Outside the Box—An Interview with Aaron Schatz," SportsTechNow.com (January 25, 2008).
 Will Leitch, "A Conversation with Football Outsiders EIC Aaron Schatz", Deadspin, August 26, 2009.
 "Q.&A. with Mike Tanier of Football Outsiders," in The Fifth Down, New York Times N.F.L. Blog, The New York Times, September 21, 2009.

See also
 The Hidden Game of Football
Advanced Football Analytics
numberFire

External links
Football Outsiders Website
Aaron Schatz on ESPN

Citations

American football strategy
National Football League websites
Fantasy sports